Asim Alizade (born 5 February 2000) is an Azerbaijani footballer who plays as a midfielder for Shamakhi FK in the Azerbaijan Premier League.

Club career
On 20 December 2020, Alizade made his debut in the Azerbaijan Premier League for Neftçi PFK match against Sabah FC.

References

External links
 

2000 births
Living people
Association football midfielders
Azerbaijani footballers
Azerbaijan youth international footballers
Azerbaijan under-21 international footballers
Azerbaijani expatriate footballers
Expatriate footballers in Latvia
Azerbaijan Premier League players
Neftçi PFK players
BFC Daugavpils players